Danilo Montaldi (1 July 1929 – 27 April 1975) was an Italian writer, intellectual and Marxist activist, who participated in the Autonomist Marxism movement.

Danilo Montaldi was born in Cremona in 1929. His father was a working class anarchist who was jailed for two years during the fascist regime. Following his release from prison he was placed under close surveillance by the fascist authorities and was unable to regain his position with the Italian railways, thus Montaldi's mother became the sole earner supporting the family. In 1944 Danilo Montaldi joined the Fronte della Gioventù and participated in the Italian resistance movement.  Following the overthrow of fascism, Montaldi was briefly a member of the Italian Communist Party, but left owing to their reformism and dogmatism. During the 1950s Montaldi developed links with a diverse range of individuals and organisations involved in far-left politics, such as Socialisme ou Barbarie (Socialism or Barbarity) in France and others in Germany, England and the United States. 
He also published his material in a broad range of journals such as Discussioni, Nuovi Argomenti, Ragionamenti, Opinione, and Passato e Presente.

Between 1960 and 1964 Montaldi worked as a commissioning editor for the Milan publishing house founded by Giangiacomo Feltrinelli, of whom he was a close collaborator in those years. At the same time he began to publish his own books, most importantly Autobiografie della leggera (1961), which has since become a classic of its kind and remains in print to this day. The book collects the life stories of people at the very margins of society, dissidents, partisans, small-time criminals, prostitutes, as well as others, and narrates these in their own words and particular vernacular. During that same period he also opened an art-gallery in Cremona, exhibiting contemporary international artists, and was involved in the making of several documentaries, one of which he directed himself, La Matàna de Po (1959).
While continuing his collaboration with publishers such as Feltrinelli and Einaudi, over the next decade he focused primarily on his own research and publications, moving away also from political activism, until his premature death in 1975.

Works
 Milano, Corea: Inchiesta sugli immigrati, (Milan, Korea: An Investigation into Immigration), Feltrinelli, 1960, (reprinted as an expanded edition by Feltrinelli in 1975 and by Donzelli in 2010)
 Autobiografie della leggera, (Autobiographies of the Leggera), Einaudi, 1961, (reprinted by Bompiani in 1998, 2012 and 2018)
 Militanti politici di base, (Autobiographies of political militants), Einaudi, 1971
 Korsch e i comunisti italiani, (Korsch and Italian Communism), Samonà e Savelli, 1975
 Saggio sulla politica comunista in Italia – 1919-1970, (Essay on the communist politics in Italy – 1919-1970), Quaderni Piacentini, 1976, (reprinted by Colibrì Edizioni in 2016) 
 Renzo Botti. I disegni della raccolta Montaldi, (Writings on the painter Renzo Botti), Anali della Biblioteca Statale di Cremona, 1989
 Bisogna Sognare. Scritti 1952 - 1975, (Uncollected Writings, Articles and Essays), Colibrì Edizioni/ Centro Luca Rossi, 1995
 Lettere 1963 - 1975. Danilo Montaldi e Giuseppe Guerreschi, (The collected letters between Montaldi and the painter Guerreschi), Anali della Biblioteca Statale di Cremona, 2000

References

1929 births
1975 deaths
Autonomism
Italian Marxists
Writers from Cremona